Herbert Kemmer (13 May 1905 – 10 December 1962) was a German field hockey player who competed in the 1928 Summer Olympics and in the 1936 Summer Olympics.

In 1928 he was a member of the German field hockey team, which won the bronze medal. He played two matches as forward.

Eight years later he won the silver medal in the field hockey competition.

External links
 
profile

1905 births
1962 deaths
German male field hockey players
Olympic field hockey players of Germany
Field hockey players at the 1928 Summer Olympics
Field hockey players at the 1936 Summer Olympics
Olympic silver medalists for Germany
Olympic bronze medalists for Germany
Olympic medalists in field hockey
Medalists at the 1936 Summer Olympics
Medalists at the 1928 Summer Olympics
20th-century German people